KVCB-LP (100.9 FM; "VCS Radio") is a radio station licensed to Vacaville, California, United States.  The station is currently owned by Vacaville Christian Schools.

Programming on KVCB-LP is produced by the students of Vacaville Christian Elementary, Middle and High School.

KVCB-LP founded the National High School Radio Network to give high school broadcasting students across the United States experience in live network programming. Each high school in the group takes turns having their students host the one-hour radio show each Wednesday evening on a volunteer basis.

References

External links
 

VCB-LP
VCB-LP
Radio stations established in 2014
2014 establishments in California
Vacaville, California